The following is a list of indoor arenas in Estonia, ordered by capacity.
The venues are by their final capacity after construction for seating-only events. There is more capacity if standing room is included (e.g. for concerts) or extra seats added.

Current arenas

See also 
List of indoor arenas in Europe
List of indoor arenas by capacity

References

 
Estonia
Indoor arenas
Estonia sport-related lists